John R. Little (born 1960) is a writer and bodybuilding advocate. A native of Canada, Little is a writer in the fields of martial arts, bodybuilding and physical conditioning.

Works

Writings on fitness
He has co-authored several books with Pete Cisco, including Static Contraction Training, Static Contraction Training for Bodybuilders, Power Factor Training and The Golfer's Two-Minute Workout.

He then co-authored Body by Science with Doug McGuff, a Medical Doctor.

He also co-authored High-intensity training the Mike Mentzer way and other books with Mike Mentzer, known bodybuilder.

He was then the sole author of Max Contraction Training, a sequel which expanded on his views on Static Contraction and Power Factor forms of training.

Scholarship on Bruce Lee's estate
John Little is considered to be one of the world's foremost authorities on Bruce Lee, his training methods and philosophies. Selected by the Bruce Lee estate, Little is the only person who has ever been authorized to review the entirety of Lee's personal notes, sketches and reading annotations and to edit books on the subject of Lee's martial art and its far-reaching philosophical underpinnings.

He is the former Associate Publisher of Bruce Lee magazine and the managing editor of Knowing is Not Enough, the official newsletter of the Jun Fan Jeet Kune Do, the official Bruce Lee martial arts organization.

Little's articles have appeared in many martial arts and health and fitness magazines in North America including Muscle and Fitness.

He is the author of The Warrior Within: The Philosophies of Bruce Lee.

Probably his most notable work is the book The Art of Expressing the Human Body, in which he shows the results of a five-year search in Bruce Lee's notes trying to find the fighter's original bodybuilding program.

Advocacy of Will Durant
John Little has also devoted much effort to popularizing the works of philosopher and historian Will Durant in the 21st century. He founded and heads the Will Durant Foundation, which is an effort to keep Durant's ideas and thoughts alive in the modern era, and has revived some previously unpublished writings of Durant through books like "Adventures in Philosophy" and "An Invitation to Philosophy," which feature some debates and symposiums held by Durant. John Little has also co-produced two documentaries about Durant using rare archive footage.

Documentary
 The Art of Wong Shun Leung: A Ving Tsun Journey
 Wong Shun Leung: The King of Talking Hands
 Bruce Lee: In Pursuit of the Dragon
 Bruce Lee: A Warrior's Journey
 The Story (film documentary short)
 Bruce Lee: In His Own Words

References

External links
John Little at the Internet Movie Database

1960 births
Living people
20th-century Canadian non-fiction writers
20th-century Canadian male writers
Canadian health and wellness writers
Canadian male non-fiction writers